Colchester is a historic town in Essex, England. 

Colchester may also refer to:

United Kingdom
 Colchester (UK Parliament constituency)
 Borough of Colchester, a district of Essex, including the town
 Baron Colchester, former Peerage title
 Colchester Green, Suffolk

United States
 Colchester, Connecticut
 Colchester (CDP), Connecticut, central borough
 Colchester Village Historic District
 Colchester, Illinois
 Colchester, New York
 Colchester, Vermont
 Colchester, Virginia

Canada
 Colchester County, Nova Scotia
 Colchester, Ontario
 Colchester (electoral district)
 Colchester (provincial electoral district)

South Africa
 Colchester, Eastern Cape

Other
 Colchester Rubber Co., a footwear brand
 The "Colchester"  was a 1160 grt ship, part of the Great Eastern Railway Fleet
Colchester bays, a type of cloth similar to Berge.